Russian-speaking Ukrainian Nationalists (RUN) ( (РУН)) is a Ukrainian organization founded in the summer of 2013. RUN is a platform for Russians in Ukraine who are Ukrainian patriots and supporters of Ukrainian independence. It has a territorial nationalistic worldview. Run is led by Serhiy Zamilyuhin.

History
The organization is the offspring of a social movement that appeared in the form of groups in social networks and became an NGO in the summer of 2013.

RUN stated in November 2014 that it aimed to take part in the October 2015 Ukrainian local elections. But in October 2015 no such party named Russian-speaking Ukrainian Nationalists was registered at the Ukrainian Ministry of Justice. In the October 2015 Kyiv local election the organization took part as a "non-party" on the election list of the Patriotic Party of Ukraine.

Ideology and stances
One of the organization's goals is to change the Ukrainian educational system so that children will learn "Russian-Ukrainian" instead of the Russian language since the organization believes the latter one was "historically imposed". The NGO has handed out pamphlets "to debunk the Soviet myths" about the Ukrainian Insurgent Army (in the summer of 2013).

References

External links
 Official website

2014 establishments in Ukraine
Organizations established in 2014
Russian political parties in Ukraine
Russian-Ukrainian culture
Russians in Ukraine
Ukrainian nationalist organizations